David Faucette House, also known as The Elms and Maude Faucette House, is a historic home located near Efland, Orange County, North Carolina.  It was built about 1820, and is a two-story, three bay, gable-roofed, vernacular Federal style frame farmhouse with a rear kitchen wing and side wing added in the 1970s. It sits on a fieldstone foundation and has flanking exterior brick end chimneys.  It features a mid to late-19th century hip-roofed front porch with turned posts and sawn brackets.

It was listed on the National Register of Historic Places in 1999.

References

Houses on the National Register of Historic Places in North Carolina
Federal architecture in North Carolina
Houses completed in 1820
Houses in Orange County, North Carolina
National Register of Historic Places in Orange County, North Carolina